The term Admiral class can refer to two classes of warship:

 , six pre-dreadnought battleships built for the Royal Navy during the late 1800s
 , of which four were planned for the Royal Navy near the end of World War I but only one completed